Caecidium is a genus of ground beetles in the family Carabidae. There are at least two described species in Caecidium, found in Japan.

Species
These two species belong to the genus Caecidium:
 Caecidium trechomorphum Ueno, 1971
 Caecidium yasudai Ueno, 1972

References

Trechinae